Champ-de-Mars station is a Montreal Metro station in the borough of Ville-Marie in Montreal, Quebec, Canada. It is operated by the Société de transport de Montréal (STM) and serves the Orange Line. It is located in Old Montreal by the Champ de Mars park. It opened on October 14, 1966, as part of the original Metro network.

Overview 
Designed by Adalbert Niklewicz, it is a normal side platform station, built in open cut due to the presence of weak Utica shale in the surrounding rock. Its entrance is located near a series of tunnels that cross the Autoroute Ville-Marie, giving access to Old Montreal.

Station improvements
In December 2014, the station became fully accessible with the installation of three elevators. The $12m project also involved the renovation of the main entrance building (including installation of a new green roof) and underground city access to Centre hospitalier de l'Université de Montréal (CHUM).

Architecture and art 

One of the most important artworks in the Metro, a set of stained glass windows by noted Quebec artist Marcelle Ferron, illuminates the mezzanine of this station. These windows, one of the artist's masterpieces and her most famous work, were given by the Government of Quebec in 1968. They were the first work of non-figurative art to be commissioned for the Metro, representing the first official entrance of Automatist art in the system.

Origin of the name
This station is named for Champ-de-Mars, a public park facing Montreal City Hall. The name is the French term for a military parade ground. It was formerly crossed by the city's fortifications, demolished in the 19th century, the foundations of which can still be seen. It was later turned into a parking lot, which was replaced by a park in 1980s.

Connecting bus routes

Nearby points of interest

Connected via the underground city
  Centre hospitalier de l'Université de Montréal (CHUM)

Other
 Place des Montréalaises
 Montreal City Hall
 Old Montreal
 Old Port
 Bonsecours Market
 Chapelle Notre-Dame-de-Bon-Secours
 Place Marguerite-Bourgeoys
 Place Marie-Josèphe-Angélique
 Place Jacques-Cartier
 Château Ramezay
Sir George-Étienne Cartier National Historic Site
 Édifice Lucien-Saulnier (former courthouse)
 Complexe Chaussegros-de-Léry (City of Montreal)
 Palais de justice (Montreal)
 Édifice Jacques-Viger

References

External links
Champ-de-Mars Station - Official page
Champ-de-Mars Station - Archive.org
Montreal by Metro, metrodemontreal.com - photos, information, and trivia
 Metro Map

Accessible Montreal Metro stations
Orange Line (Montreal Metro)
Railway stations in Canada opened in 1966
Old Montreal
Downtown Montreal